Bandung Berisik  is a metal festivals in Indonesia. Founded by Bandung-based metal community Ujungberung Rebel and Homeless Crew. The festival's priority is to present bands across metal genres, based on underground scene popularity.

History
The first Bandung Berisik was on September 23, 1995, in Kalimas field Ujung Berung Bandung City. The second was held in Saparua Sport Center on July 20, 1997. The third was held at Saparua Sport Center on June 13, 2002, after five years absent. A years later, on August 10, 2003, Bandung Berisik Metalfest has been back, in this fourth time, the stage was Persib FC stadium. After an eight-year break, Bandung Berisik was back. This time not in Bandung, but In Cimahi, another city that is located in West Java.

Trivia
 Bandung Berisik is NOISY BANDUNG in English translation.

References

External links
Official Website
Twitter
Facebook
Youtube
Soundcloud

Heavy metal festivals in Indonesia